The HTC Touch Viva is a Windows Mobile smartphone developed by the High Tech Computer Corporation of Taiwan. Part of the HTC Touch Family, it incorporates quad band GSM, as well as the proprietary TouchFLO 3D user interface developed by HTC.

Specifications 
The following specifications are those found on the HTC website.
Screen size: 
Screen resolution: 320 x 240
Input devices: Resistive Touchscreen with Stylus, Hardware Keys
Battery: 1100 mAh
Talk time: 480 minutes
Standby time: 270 hours
2-megapixel rear-facing camera with fixed-focus
Texas Instruments OMAP 850 201 MHz processor
RAM: 128 MB
ROM: 256 MB
microSDHC
Operating system: Windows Mobile 6.1 Professional, Android (unofficial)
Quad band GSM/GPRS/EDGE (GSM 850, GSM 900, GSM 1800, GSM 1900)
Wi-Fi (802.11b/g)
Bluetooth 2.0 + EDR & A2DP
Mini USB (HTC ExtUSB)
Size:  (h)  (w)  (d)
Weight:  with battery

References 

HTC smartphones
Windows Mobile Professional devices